Aliabad-e Alu (also Romanized as ‘Alīābād-e Ālū; also known as Kalāteh-ye ‘Alī Ālū and Kalāteh-ye ‘Alī Āllū) is a village in Azari Rural District, in the Central District of Esfarayen County, North Khorasan Province, Iran. At the 2006 census, its population was 153, in 43 families.

References 

Populated places in Esfarayen County